Roundtop Mountain is a stratovolcano located on the Aleutian island of Unimak in the U.S. state of Alaska. Its last eruption was sometime between 9,100 and 10,000 years ago. This geographic feature was first called "Dome" in 1897 by Lieutenant Commander J. F. Moser, of the U.S. Navy. Its name was reported as "Round Top" by the U.S. Coast and Geodetic Survey in 1902. Isanotski Peaks, the nearest higher neighbor, is positioned  to the west-southwest.

See also
List of mountain peaks of Alaska
List of volcanoes in the United States

References

External links
 Weather forecast: Roundtop Mountain
 

Roundtop
Roundtop
Roundtop
Holocene stratovolcanoes